This page lists the World Best Year Performance in the year 2002 in the men's decathlon. One of the main events during this season were the 2002 European Championships in Munich, Germany, where the competition started on August 7, 2002 and ended on August 8, 2002. Roman Šebrle had broken the world record in the previous year, collecting 9026 points at the 2001 Hypo-Meeting in Götzis, Austria.

Records

2002 World Year Ranking

See also
2002 Hypo-Meeting

References
decathlon2000
IAAF
apulanta
IAAF Year Ranking

2002
Decathlon Year Ranking, 2002